Jan Srdínko (born February 22, 1974) is a former Czech professional ice hockey player. Srdinko most recently was a member of HC Slovan Bratislava in the Slovak Extraliga. Srdinko also played for HC Vsetín, HC Sparta Praha, Leksands IF and HC Kladno. Srdinko has been a member of six Czech Extraliga championship teams at HC Vsetín and once with HC Sparta.

Career statistics

References

External links

1974 births
Living people
Czech ice hockey defencemen
VHK Vsetín players
HC Sparta Praha players
HC Slovan Bratislava players
Rytíři Kladno players
New Jersey Devils draft picks
People from Benešov
Leksands IF players
HC Sibir Novosibirsk players
HC Oceláři Třinec players
HC Kometa Brno players
HC Tábor players
Sportspeople from the Central Bohemian Region
Czech expatriate ice hockey players in Russia
Czech expatriate ice hockey players in Sweden
Czech expatriate ice hockey players in Slovakia